Gerald Stebelton is a former Republican member of the Ohio House of Representatives, representing the 77th District from 2007 to 2014.

Career
After working as an aeronautical engineer and contracting officer for Battelle Memorial Institute, leading negotiating teams in Iran and Germany in the 1960s and '70's, Stebelton earned a law degree and became an assistant prosecuting attorney in Franklin County.

He is the senior shareholder of the Lancaster law firm Stebelton, Aranda & Snider, he has also served on the Lancaster City Council and Board of Education, and is a past member of the Republican Central Committee.

House of Representatives
Stebelton initially ran for the House in 2006, after incumbent Tim Schaffer moved to the Ohio Senate.  He won decisively, and was reelected in 2008, and ran again unopposed in 2010.

For the 129th General Assembly, Speaker of the House William G. Batchelder has named Stebelton as a member of the Republican majority caucus' Policy Committee, as well as member of the Judiciary and Ethics Committee, the Finance and Appropriations and the Primary and Secondary Education Subcommittee, as well as the Chairman of the Education Committee.

In 2012, Stebelton won a final term with 59% of the vote against Democrat Kelly Bryant. He was term-limited in 2014.

References

External links
 Jerry for State Representative official campaign site

Living people
Ohio State University College of Engineering alumni
Republican Party members of the Ohio House of Representatives
1939 births
21st-century American politicians
Capital University Law School alumni